Helena Znaniecki Lopata (October 1, 1925 – February 12, 2003) was a Polish-born American sociologist, author and researcher.

Life and education 
Born in Poznan, Poland to her father Florian Znaniecki, a sociologist, and mother Eileen Markley, an attorney, the family fled Poland to the United States due to Nazi rule. After settling in the US, Lopata finished high school and went on to college to obtain a bachelor's degree, master's degree, and finally a Ph.D. in sociology from the University of Chicago. Lopata went on to teach at Roosevelt University and then Loyola University, Chicago where she served as chair of the department and Director for the "Center for the Comparative Study of Social Roles". She also took her teaching on the road as a visiting professor at the University of Southern California, University of Guelph, University of Victoria and Boston College. In 1946 Lopata married businessman Richard Lopata and had a son, Stefan and a daughter, Theodora.
She died in 2003 at the age of 77 in Delavan Lake, Wisconsin.

Career Highlights and Accomplishments
Helena Lopata published twenty books during her career along with numerous articles. She was elected to many presidencies throughout her career for organizations including SWS, SSSP, chair of many ASA committees, and participated in many seminars relating to family and the sociology of aging.
She did much research on the 'occupational housewife' that changed the way Americans looked at the changing roles of women during that time. She wrote a book on the same topic, which was the first such book. She was a professor at Roosevelt University before going to Loyola in 1969 where she did most of her research.

Awards and honors
Lopata received the following awards: "The Mead & Feminist Mentoring Award" from the Study of Symbolic Interaction, the "Mieczyslaw Haiman Award" from the Polish American Historical Association, the "Distinguished Scholar Award Society" for the Study of Social Problems, and lastly the "Bronislaw Malinowski Award" from the Polish Institute of Arts and Sciences in America. In addition to theses awards she also received an Honorary Doctorate of Sciences from the University of Guelph.

Publications 
 City Women:  Work, Jobs, Occupations, Careers
 Circles and Settings-Roles Changes of American Women
 Occupation: Housewife, Oxford University Press, 1971.  
 Current Research on Occupations and Professions 1996: Getting Down to Business
 Women as Widows:  Support Systems, Elsevier Science, Ltd, 1979.  
 Current Widowhood: Myths & Realities
 Polish Americans, Transaction Publications, 1994.

References 

1925 births
2003 deaths
American sociologists
American women sociologists
Polish emigrants to the United States
University of Chicago alumni
Roosevelt University faculty
Loyola University Chicago faculty
People from Poznań